General elections were held in Bolivia on 3 July 1966. René Barrientos of the Front of the Bolivian Revolution (FRB) was elected President with 67% of the vote, whilst the FRB won a majority in both houses of Congress. James Dunkerley describes the election as not free and fair since a major segment of the opposition was excluded from participating.

Background
Following the 1964 elections, Barrientos had led a military coup to remove Víctor Paz Estenssoro from power. In May 1965, Juan Lechín Oquendo, a labor leader who was the head of the left faction of the Nationalist Revolutionary Movement, was arrested and expelled from the country.

Campaign
Several alliances were formed for the elections:

Results

See also
Bolivian National Congress, 1966–1969

References

Elections in Bolivia
Bolivia
1966 in Bolivia
Presidential elections in Bolivia